Each country's final squad has to comprise 21 players. The final squads were confirmed by FIFA on 4 October 2022.

Group A

Brazil
Head coach: Simone Jatobá

India
Head coach:  Thomas Dennerby

Morocco
Head coach:  Anthony Rimasson

United States
Head coach:  Natalia Astrain

Group B

Chile
Head coach: Alex Castro

Germany
Head coach: Friederike Kromp

New Zealand
Head coach: Leon Birnie

Nigeria
Head coach: Bankole Olowookere

Group C

China
Head coach: Wang Anzhi

Colombia
Head coach: Carlos Paniagua

Mexico
Head coach: Ana Galindo

Spain
Head coach: Kenio Gonzalo

Group D

Canada
Head coach:  Emma Humphries

France
Head coach: Cécile Locatelli

Japan
Head coach: Michihisa Kano

Tanzania
Head coach: Bakari Shime

References 

2022